Nordsee One is an offshore wind farm in the German part of the North Sea. 
It has a nameplate capacity of 332 MW and was commissioned in 2017. 
It uses 54 Senvion 6.2M126 wind turbines that are expected to produce 1200 GWh of electricity annually. The wind farm is owned by Northland Power (85%) and Innogy (15%). 
Offshore construction began in December 2015. All 54 turbines get their rotor shaft main bearings replaced during 2021-2022.

References

External links

 Nordsee One website
 4Coffshore

Wind farms in Germany
Offshore wind farms in the North Sea